The following is a list of public housing estates in Sha Tin, Hong Kong, including Home Ownership Scheme (HOS), Private Sector Participation Scheme (PSPS), Sandwich Class Housing Scheme (SCHS), Flat-for-Sale Scheme (FFSS), and Tenants Purchase Scheme (TPS) estates.

History

When Sha Tin New Town was being developed, the beach and Sha Tin Hoi was reclaimed to construct Lek Yuen Estate, Wo Che Estate, Sha Kok Estate and Jat Min Chuen.

Overview

Estates

Fung Wo Estate

Fung Wo Estate opened beside Wo Che Estate in 2013 on the site of the former Sha Tin Police Married Quarters, which were demolished in 2007. It comprises three blocks housing 3,500 people.

Lek Yuen Estate

Lek Yuen Estate was the first public housing estate in Sha Tin, and is built on the reclaimed land of Sha Tin Hoi, located near Wo Che Estate and Sha Tin station. The estate consists of seven residential blocks completed in 1975.

Lek Yuen Estate was one of the first of a "new generation" of estates which were more self-contained with regard to the provision of amenities and shopping. Covered walkways allow tenants to do their shopping close to home, without relying on cars or trains. This is now a standard element of housing estate design in Hong Kong. When the old Sha Tin market was being demolished, many merchants were relocated to the Lek Yuen Estate shops, though some complained of comparatively "exorbitant" rents.

The shopping centre is now owned by The Link REIT. The estate locality has several other facilities including a market, a park, a public clinic, an entertainment building called "Sha Tin Fun City", and numerous schools. An elevated walkway runs through the estate, linking it to Sha Tin Town Centre (to the south) and Wo Che Estate (to the north).

Pok Hong Estate

Pok Hong Estate is a mixed estate consisting of eight residential blocks completed in 1982, 1983 and 1985. Its site was originally a shallow sand beach near Sha Tin Hoi. Some of the flats were sold to the tenants through Tenants Purchase Scheme Phase 5 in 2002. In 2019, the housing estate has an estimated population of 16,063.

Sha Kok Estate

Sha Kok Estate is located near Pok Hong Estate, Jat Min Chuen and Sha Tin Wai station.

The blocks in the estate are named after birds.

The Hong Kong Academy for Gifted Education (HKAGE) moved in 2012 into the former Sha Kok Primary School in Sha Kok Estate, sharing the same building with Hong Kong Education City. It is located next to Buddhist Kok Kwong Secondary School.

Shui Chuen O Estate

Shui Chuen O Estate comprises 18 blocks opened between 2015 and 2017, offering 11,123 public rental flats. It also includes a commercial complex with 59 shops and an indoor market. The new estate sits on a hillside and will be connected to the lower-lying areas by footbridges and lift towers, providing easy access to Pok Hong Estate and Sha Tin Wai station.

Wo Che Estate

Wo Che Estate is the second public housing estate in Sha Tin, after Lek Yuen Estate. Built on the reclaimed land of Sha Tin Hoi, the estate consists of 13 residential blocks completed in 1977, 1980 and 2003.

The 13th house in the estate, King Wo House, was originally the HOS house called "Fung Sui Court", but the Hong Kong Housing Authority decided to transfer it to rental house before it was occupied in 2003.

Kwong Yuen Estate, Kwong Lam Court and Hong Lam Court 

Kwong Yuen Estate is a mixed public and TPS estate in Siu Lek Yuen. Unlike other public estates in Sha Tin, Kwong Yuen Estate is built on sloping platform, instead of reclaimed land. In 2001, some of the flats were sold to the tenants through Tenants Purchase Scheme Phase 4.

The Commercial Centre Complex of the estate was designed to merge into the village environment in the vicinity. Unlike the commercial centres of other public housing estates, the Complex consists of five two-level blocks which are standing on two platforms. The 26m clock tower of the Complex is to reinforce the image of the Commercial Centre. In 1992, the design of the commercial centre won a Certificate of Merit in the annual design competition which was organized by The Hong Kong Institute of Architects.

Shek Mun Estate

Shek Mun Estate is a public housing estate built on reclaimed land in Shek Mun, Sha Tin, near the MTR Shek Mun station. It consists of six residential buildings completed in 2009 and 2019 respectively.

A second phase, comprising four more blocks, started construction in 2015. This phase occupies a 2.25 ha site across the road from the existing estate and also includes a commercial centre, a welfare block, a kindergarten, a car park, and public space.

Jat Min Chuen

Jat Min Chuen is one of the few estates located within Sha Tin that is developed by the Hong Kong Housing Society. It consists of three residential buildings completed in 1981 and 1982. It was named for Mr. Tan Jat Ming, the former honorary treasurer of the Society.

Unlike other estates, the Hong Kong Housing Society financed the construct of Jat Min Chuen using a bank loan at a high interest rate, rather than from the Government. Therefore, the rent in the estate was forced to be put up as the Society needed to return money to banks afterwards.

Greenhill Villa

Greenhill Villa is a Subsidised Sale Flats Project court developed by Hong Kong Housing Society and constructed by Chun Wo Construction, located at Siu Lek Yuen of Sha Tin District. It comprises three 35 to 38-storey towers providing 1,020 small and medium-sized flats. It was launched for pre-sale in February 2016 and completed in 2019.

Sunshine Grove

Sunshine Grove is a Sandwich Class Housing Scheme court in Yuen Chau Kok, Sha Tin, near City One Shatin and MTR City One station. It is developed by the Hong Kong Housing Society and consists of two blocks built in 1999.

Yu Chui Court

Yu Chui Court is a HOS court in Yuen Chau Kok, Sha Tin, near MTR City One station. Built on the reclaimed land of Sha Tin Hoi, it consists of 16 blocks (except the 2 demolished blocks) built in 2001.

In 2000, Block E and D of the court was found short-piling, in which only four of the 18 piles of the blocks could meet the specifications. Finally, the government decided to demolish the two blocks for safety reasons. The site was then reconstructed as a garden.

Yue Tin Court
Yue Tin Court is a HOS court in Yuen Chau Kok, Sha Tin, near City One Shatin and City One station. It has seven blocks built in 1982 and 1983 respectively.

Yue Shing Court

Yue Shing Court is a HOS court in Sha Tin, near Sha Kok Estate and Jat Min Chuen. Built on reclaimed land of Sha Tin Hoi, the court consists of four blocks built in 1980.

See also
 Public housing in Hong Kong
 List of public housing estates in Hong Kong

References

Sha Tin